Crawley Creek is a stream in the U.S. state of West Virginia.
 
Crawley Creek has the name of James Crawley, a pioneer surveyor.

See also
List of rivers of West Virginia

References

Rivers of Logan County, West Virginia
Rivers of West Virginia